Bilsteinbach (in its lower course: Hirschberger Bach) is a river of North Rhine-Westphalia, Germany. It flows through the Bilstein Cave and discharges into the Schorenbach near Warstein.

See also
List of rivers of North Rhine-Westphalia

Rivers of North Rhine-Westphalia
Rivers of Germany